Gileston railway station served the village of Gileston in South Wales.

Description
The station had two platforms with a building on the down platform. The station building was of red brick with yellow quoins. The platforms were linked with a metal footbridge. In later years, a wooden canopy was built on the other platform when the opening of RAF St Athan increased traffic on the line. There was also a small goods yard off the down line.

Name
In the early stages of planning, the station's name was not decided upon, and the names 'Gileston' and 'St Athan' were used interchangeably. The name Gileston was not fixed until 1896. At some point in its later life, the station's nameboard read 'Gileston for St Athan'. The boards displayed this name until closing, but the station but was usually referred to just as Gileston.

Additional Duties
When the southern section of the Llantrisant-Aberthaw line between Cowbridge and Aberthaw closed to passengers, the staff at St Athan Road and Aberthaw Low Level were withdrawn, and their duties were allotted to the staff at Gileston.

Closure
The station closed when passenger services on the line ended in 1964. Although the Vale of Glamorgan Line has since re-opened to passengers, no new station at Gileston has been built.

Notes

References
Chapman, Colin (1998) The Vale of Glamorgan Railway The Oakwood Press

Chapman, Colin (1984) The Cowbridge Railway Oxford Publishing Company

Disused railway stations in the Vale of Glamorgan
Railway stations in Great Britain opened in 1897
Railway stations in Great Britain closed in 1964
Former Barry Railway stations
Beeching closures in Wales
St Athan